Giulio Fiou (born 17 May 1938) is an Italian politician.

He served as mayor of Aosta as a member of the Democratic Party of the Left from June 1992 to May 1995. Giulio Fiou was also elected to the Regional Council of Aosta Valley in the XII and XI legislatures.

See also
List of mayors of Aosta

References 

Living people
1938 births
People from Aosta
Democratic Party of the Left politicians
20th-century Italian politicians
21st-century Italian politicians
Mayors of Aosta